Juliosebaste or Iuliosebaste, also possibly known as Heliosebaste, was a town of ancient Cilicia and later of Isauria, inhabited during Byzantine times. Under the name of Heliosebaste, it became a bishopric; no longer the seat of a residential bishop, it remains a titular see of the Roman Catholic Church.

Its site is located near Asar tepe, in Asiatic Turkey.

References

Populated places in ancient Cilicia
Populated places in ancient Isauria
Former populated places in Turkey
Populated places of the Byzantine Empire
History of Antalya Province
Catholic titular sees in Asia
Gazipaşa District